The Seaton Delaval Stakes was a Group 3 flat horse race in Great Britain open to two-year-old horses. It was run at Newcastle, and in its later years it was scheduled to take place in August.

History
The event was named after Seaton Delaval, a village located to the north of Newcastle. It was established in 1867, and was originally held in late June. For much of its history it took place on the day after the Northumberland Plate. It was usually contested over 5 furlongs.

The Seaton Delaval Stakes continued to be staged in June until 1961. It was switched to early August in 1962. The present grading system was introduced in 1971, and the event was classed at Group 3 level. It was extended to 7 furlongs in 1976.

The race was discontinued after 1985.

Records
Leading jockey since 1960 (2 wins):
 Taffy Thomas – Unity (1964), Galipar (1966)
 Lester Piggott – Sky Rocket (1967), Blessed Rock (1973)
 Willie Carson – Sharpen Up (1971), Sexton Blake (1977)
 Steve Cauthen – Knoxville (1983), Zaizafon (1984)

Leading trainer since 1960 (3 wins):
 Barry Hills – Sexton Blake (1977), Knoxville (1983), Zaizafon (1984)

Winners since 1960

Earlier winners

 1867: La Mousse
 1868: Number Nip
 1869: Agility
 1870: King of the Forest
 1871: Hunsdon
 1872: Mediator
 1873: Organist
 1874: Holy Friar
 1876: Black Knight
 1877: Carillon
 1878: Jennie Agnes
 1879: Novice
 1880: Abbess of Beauchief
 1881: Bonnie Rose
 1882: Chislehurst
 1883: Knight Errant
 1884: Albert
 1885: Minting
 1886: Lady Muncaster
 1887: Friday
 1888: Chittabob
 1889: Loup
 1890: Cleator
 1891: Persistive
 1892: New Guinea
 1893: Chin Chin
 1894: Jim Selby
 1895: Amaryllis
 1896: Fiorini
 1897: De Rougement
 1898: Model Agnes
 1899: O'Donovan Rossa
 1900: Orchid
 1901: Abbot's Anne
 1902: Mrs Gamp
 1903: Henry the First
 1904: Cyanean
 1905: Illustrious
 1906: Orwell
 1907: Bromus
 1908: Holiday House
 1909: Charles O'Malley
 1910: Manwolf
 1911: Combination
 1912: St Begoe
 1913: Cressingham
 1914: Egretta
 1919: Prince Herod
 1920: Thunderer
 1921: Seraph colt
 1922: Prunus
 1923: Appleby
 1924: Iron Mask
 1925: Blackmoor
 1926: Helene
 1927: Carsebreck
 1929: Old Friend
 1930: Pot-Pourri
 1931: Bonnie Briar
 1932: Honour Bright
 1933: Armour Bright
 1934: Blue Charm
 1936: Royal Romance
 1937: Conversation Piece
 1938: Buoyant
 1939: Tullyford
 1947: Gold Mist
 1948: Ballisland
 1950: Judith Paris
 1951: Dornoch
 1952: Good Brandy
 1953: Tiger Kloof
 1954: North Cone
 1955: Vigo
 1956: Lunar Way
 1957: Pinched
 1958: Lindsay
 1959: Tin Whistle

See also
 Horse racing in Great Britain
 List of British flat horse races

References

 
 

Flat races in Great Britain
Newcastle Racecourse
Flat horse races for two-year-olds
Recurring sporting events established in 1867
1867 establishments in England
Discontinued horse races
1985 disestablishments in England
Recurring sporting events disestablished in 1985